The year 2012 was the fourth year in the history of BRACE, a mixed martial arts promotion based in Australia. In 2012 BRACE held 5 events.

Events list

BRACE 18

BRACE 18 was an event held on 21 December 2012 at Convention Centre, Canberra, Australia.

Results

BRACE 17

BRACE 17 was an event held on 27 October 2012, at Southport RSL, Gold Coast, Australia.

Results

BRACE 15
BRACE 15 was an event held on April 28, 2012, at Ex-Services Bowling Club, Coffs Harbour, Australia.

Results

BRACE 14

BRACE 14 was an event held on February 18, 2012, at Convention Centre, Canberra, Australia.

Results

References 

2012 in mixed martial arts
2012 in Australian sport
BRACE (mixed martial arts) events